Cooch Behar is a town in the Indian state of West Bengal and headquarters of Cooch Behar District.

Cooch Behar may also refer to:

 Cooch Behar District, a political subdivision of the Indian state of West Bengal
 Cooch Behar (Lok Sabha constituency), a Lok Sabha (lower house) constituency of India
 Cooch Behar Uttar (Vidhan Sabha constituency)
 Cooch Behar Dakshin (Vidhan Sabha constituency)
 Cooch Behar I (community development block)
 Cooch Behar II (community development block)
 Cooch Behar railway station
 New Cooch Behar railway station
 Cooch Behar State Railway
 Cooch Behar Airport
 Cooch Behar Palace
 Cooch Behar State, the historical kingdom

ru:Куч-Бихар (значения)